Joo Won Ahn (born 1993) is a South Korean ballet dancer who is currently a principal dancer with the American Ballet Theatre.

Ahn was born in Wonju. He trained at the Y.J. Ballet People Academy and Sunhwa Arts School, then entered the Korea National University of Arts in 2012. In 2013, after he won a gold medal at the Youth America Grand Prix, he joined the American Ballet Theatre Studio Company. He became an apprentice with the main company in January the following year and was taken to the corps de ballet five months later. He became a soloist in 2019 and principal dancer in 2020, at age 26. He is the second Korean to reach this position, after Hee Seo.

References

Living people
1993 births
People from Wonju
South Korean male ballet dancers
American Ballet Theatre principal dancers
South Korean expatriates in the United States
21st-century ballet dancers